Alexander Peya and Bruno Soares were the defending champions and successfully defended their title, defeating Bob Bryan and Mike Bryan in the final, 7–6(7–3), 6–7(1–7), [13–11].

Seeds

Draw

Draw

External links
 Main draw

Doubles